Water figwort is a common name for several plants and may refer to:

Scrophularia auriculata, found in western Europe and north Africa
Scrophularia umbrosa, found in Europe and Asia